Delhi is an unincorporated community in Las Animas County, Colorado, United States.  The U.S. Post Office at Model (ZIP Code 81059) now serves Delhi postal addresses.

Delhi was the location of a scene in the 1973 film Badlands where Martin Sheen refuels the stolen vehicle he is driving at a gas station before fleeing the scene when he spots a sheriff.

Delhi was also known for being the location of Colorado's last wigwag railroad signal prior to its removal in March 2021 (replaced with standard railroad crossing flashers).

Geography
Delhi is located at  (37.642238,-104.018383).

See also
 List of cities and towns in Colorado

References

Unincorporated communities in Las Animas County, Colorado
Unincorporated communities in Colorado